Gallon is a surname. Notable people with the surname include:
Aguinaldo Roberto Gallon, Brazilian footballer
Dennis P. Gallon, American academic
Gary Gallon (1945–2003), Canadian environmental activist
Johan Gallon (born 1978), French footballer
Thomas Gallon (1886–1945), Canadian track and field athlete

See also
Gallo (surname)